Capibaribe may refer to:

Capibaribe River, a river located in Brazilian state of Pernambuco
Clube Náutico Capibaribe, a Brazilian sports team
Santa Cruz do Capibaribe, a municipality located in Brazilian state of Pernambuco